Final league standings for the 1938-39 St. Louis Soccer League, also known as the Inter-City Soccer Loop.

History
The St. Louis Soccer League collapsed in 1938.  League and team officials then reorganized the league to include teams from Chicago and Cleveland.  Known both as the St. Louis Soccer League and the Inter-City Soccer Loop, the league lasted one more season before formally disbanding in 1939.

League standings

External links
St. Louis Soccer Leagues (RSSSF)
The Year in American Soccer - 1939

1938-39
1938–39 domestic association football leagues
1938–39 in American soccer
St Louis
St Louis